Ibrahima Fall (born 4 December 1955) is a Senegalese sprinter. He competed in the men's 4 × 100 metres relay at the 1984 Summer Olympics.

References

1955 births
Living people
Athletes (track and field) at the 1984 Summer Olympics
Senegalese male sprinters
Olympic athletes of Senegal
Place of birth missing (living people)